The 1988–89 South Midlands League season was 60th in the history of South Midlands League.

Premier Division

The Premier Division featured 15 clubs which competed in the division last season, along with 3 new clubs:
Pitstone & Ivinghoe, promoted from last season's Division One
Brache Sparta, promoted from last season's Division One
Thame United, transferred from the Hellenic League Premier Division

League table

Division One

The Division One featured 10 clubs which competed in the division last season, along with 2 new clubs:
Cranfield United, relegated from Premier Division
Tring Athletic

League table

References

1988–89
8